What's Wrong with Nanette? (German: Was ist los mit Nanette?) is a 1929 German silent film directed by Holger-Madsen and starring Ruth Weyher, Georg Alexander and Harry Hardt.

Cast
In alphabetical order
 Georg Alexander as Nachtredakteur Dr. Richard Curtius  
 Hanne Brinkmann as Haushälterin Maria  
 Harry Gondi as Reporter Peter Flachs  
 Karl Harbacher as Faktotum für alles  
 Harry Hardt as Theodor 'Toto' Thomas  
 Hans Junkermann as Theaterdirektor Runkel  
 Margarete Kupfer as Tante Finchen  
 Maria Mindzenty as Anita Morell  
 Fritz Spira as Chefredakteur  
 Ruth Weyher as Frau Dr. Curtius / Nanette

References

Bibliography
 Alfred Krautz. International directory of cinematographers, set- and costume designers in film, Volume 4. Saur, 1984.

External links

1929 films
Films of the Weimar Republic
German silent feature films
Films directed by Holger-Madsen
German black-and-white films